An anapodoton (from Ancient Greek  anapódoton: "that which lacks an apodosis, that is, the consequential clause in a conditional sentence), plural anapodota, is a rhetorical device related to the anacoluthon; both involve a thought being interrupted or discontinued before it is fully expressed. It is a figure of speech or discourse that is an incomplete sentence, consisting of a subject or complement without the requisite object. The stand-alone subordinate clause suggests or implies a subject (a main clause), but this is not actually provided.

As an intentional rhetorical device, it is generally used for set phrases, where the full form is understood, and would thus be tedious to spell out, as in "When in Rome [do as the Romans]."

Anapodota are common in Classical Chinese and languages that draw from it, such as Japanese, where a long literary phrase is commonly abbreviated to just its condition. For example, Zhuangzi's phrase  "A frog in a well cannot conceive of the ocean", meaning "people of limited experience have a narrow world view" is rendered as  "A frog in a well" in Modern Chinese, and as  "A frog in a well" in Modern Japanese, abbreviating  "A frog in a well does not know the great ocean".

Other uses 
It is also said to occur when a main clause is left unsaid due to a speaker interrupting him/herself to revise a thought, thus leaving the initial clause unresolved, but then making use of it nonetheless by recasting and absorbing it into a new, grammatically complete sentence. 

Though grammatically incorrect, anapodoton is a commonplace feature of everyday informal speech. It, therefore, appears frequently in dramatic writing and in fiction in the form of direct speech or the representation of stream of consciousness.

Examples: 
 "If you think I'm going to sit here and take your insults..."
(implied: "then you are mistaken")
When life gives you lemons..." 
(implied: "you make lemonade")
"If they came to hear me beg..."
(implied: "then they will be disappointed") [From the Halo video game series]
"The only easy day..."
(implied: "was yesterday")
"When the going gets tough..."
(implied: "the tough get going")
"If you can’t stand the heat..."
(implied: "get out of the kitchen")

See also 
 Aposiopesis
 Xiehouyu

References 

Rhetorical techniques
Figures of speech